Perserikatan Sepakbola Indonesia Tjirebon or PSIT Cirebon is a football club based in Cirebon, West Java. PSIT is the oldest football club in Cirebon, established in 1934. They currently play at Liga 3 and their homebase is Bima Stadium. Their main rivals are PSGJ Cirebon.

References

External links
 Club profile at pssi.org
 

Football clubs in Indonesia
Football clubs in West Java
Association football clubs established in 1934
1934 establishments in the Dutch East Indies